Xica is a 1976 Brazilian comedy film directed and written by Carlos Diegues, based on the novel by João Felício dos Santos, which is a romanticized retelling of the true story of Chica da Silva, an 18th-century African slave in Brazil, who attracts the attention of a powerful Portuguese land-owner and eventually rises into the Brazilian high society. The movie stars Zezé Motta, Walmor Chagas and José Wilker. It was chosen as the Brazilian submission for the Academy Award for Best Foreign Language Film at the 49th Academy Awards, but it failed to get a nomination.

Plot
The film is based on the novel Memórias do Distrito de Diamantina, written by João Felicio dos Santos (who has a small role in the film as a Roman Catholic pastor). It is a romanticized retelling of the true story of Chica da Silva, an 18th-century African slave in the state of Minas Gerais, who attracts the attention of João Fernandes de Oliveira, a Portuguese sent by Lisbon with the Crown's exclusive contract for mining diamonds, and eventually becomes his lover, rises into power and into the Brazilian high society of the time. Moreover, João quickly lets the intendant and other authorities know that he can be bribed, and gets onto their corruption scheme. Eventually Lisbon hears of João's (and Xica's) excesses and sends an inspector. José, a political radical, is another main character, who provides Xica refuge.

Cast
 Zezé Motta as Xica da Silva (based on Chica da Silva)
 Walmor Chagas as João Fernandes
 Altair Lima as Intendent
 Elke Maravilha as Hortência
 Stepan Nercessian as José
 Rodolfo Arena as Sargeant
 José Wilker as The Count of Valadares
 Marcos Vinicius as Teodoro
 João Felicio dos Santos as pastor

TV adaptation 
In 1996, the now defunct TV station Rede Manchete successfully adapted the film plot to the telenovela format, directed by Walter Avancini, written by Walcyr Carrasco and starring Taís Araújo as the title character. This telenovela marked the first time an Afro-Brazilian actress played the lead role on a TV show. In 2005, SBT re-aired Xica da Silva.

See also
 List of submissions to the 49th Academy Awards for Best Foreign Language Film
 List of Brazilian submissions for the Academy Award for Best Foreign Language Film

References

External links

1976 comedy films
1976 films
Brazilian comedy films
Films based on Brazilian novels
Films directed by Carlos Diegues
1970s Portuguese-language films